Shogun, officially , was the title of the military dictators of Japan during most of the period spanning from 1185 to 1868. Nominally appointed by the Emperor, shoguns were usually the de facto rulers of the country, though during part of the Kamakura period, shoguns were themselves figureheads, with real power in hands of the Shikken of the Hōjō clan. 

The office of shogun was in practice hereditary, though over the course of the history of Japan several different clans held the position. The title was originally held by military commanders during Heian period in the eighth and ninth centuries. When Minamoto no Yoritomo gained political ascendency over Japan in 1185, the title was revived to regularize his position, making him the first shogun in the usually understood sense.

The tent symbolized the shogun's role as the military's field commander but also denoted that such an office was meant to be temporary. Nevertheless, the institution, known in English as the shogunate, persisted for nearly 700 years, ending when Tokugawa Yoshinobu relinquished the office to Emperor Meiji in 1867 as part of the Meiji Restoration.

Etymology
The term  is the abbreviation of the historical title Sei-i Taishōgun 征 (sei, せい) means "conquer" or "subjugate" and 夷 (i, い) means "barbarian" or "savage". 大 (dai, だい) means "great",  (shō, しょう) means "commander" and 軍 (gun, ぐん) means "army". Thus, a translation of Seii Taishōgun would be "Commander-in-Chief of the Expeditionary Force Against the Barbarians".

The term originally referred to the general who commanded the army sent to fight the tribes of northern Japan, but after the twelfth century, the term was used to designate the leader of the samurai. The term is often translated generalissimo and is also used for such military leaders of foreign nations by Japanese.

Bakufu
The administration of a shogun is called  in Japanese and literally means "government from the ". During battles, the head of the samurai army would sit in a scissor chair inside a semi-open tent, called a maku, that exhibited its respective mon or blazon. The application of the term bakufu to the shogun government shows an extremely strong and representative symbolism.

Titles
Historically, similar terms to Seii Taishōgun were used with varying degrees of responsibility, although none of them had equal or more importance than Seii Taishōgun. Some of them were:

History

First shogun 
There is no consensus among the various authors since some sources consider Tajihi no Agatamori the first, others say Ōtomo no Otomaro, other sources assure that the first was Sakanoue no Tamuramaro, while others avoid the problem by just mentioning from the first Kamakura shogun Minamoto no Yoritomo.

Heian period (794–1185)

Originally, the title of Sei-i Taishōgun ("Commander-in-Chief of the Expeditionary Force Against the Barbarians") was given to military commanders during the early Heian period for the duration of military campaigns against the Emishi, who resisted the governance of the Kyoto-based imperial court. Ōtomo no Otomaro was the first Sei-i Taishōgun. The most famous of these shoguns was Sakanoue no Tamuramaro.

In the later Heian period, one more shogun was appointed. Minamoto no Yoshinaka was named sei-i taishōgun during the Genpei War, only to be killed shortly thereafter by Minamoto no Yoshitsune.

Sakanoue no Tamuramaro

Sakanoue no Tamuramaro (758–811) was a Japanese general who fought against the Emishi tribes of northern Japan (settled in the territory that today integrates the provinces of Mutsu and Dewa). Tamarumaro was the first general to bend these tribes, integrating their territory to that of the Yamato State. For his military feats he was named Seii Taishōgun and probably because he was the first to win the victory against the northern tribes he is generally recognized as the first shogun in history. (Note: according to historical sources Ōtomo no Otomaro also had the title of Seii Taishōgun).

Kamakura shogunate (1192–1333)

In the early 11th century, daimyō protected by samurai came to dominate internal Japanese politics. Two of the most powerful families – the Taira and Minamoto – fought for control over the declining imperial court. The Taira family seized control from 1160 to 1185, but was defeated by the Minamoto in the Battle of Dan-no-ura. Minamoto no Yoritomo seized power from the central government and aristocracy and by 1192 established a feudal system based in Kamakura in which the private military, the samurai, gained some political powers while the Emperor and the aristocracy remained the de jure rulers. 

In 1192, Yoritomo was awarded the title of Sei-i Taishōgun by Emperor Go-Toba and the political system he developed with a succession of shoguns as the head became known as a shogunate. Hojo Masako's (Yoritomo's wife) family, the Hōjō, seized power from the Kamakura shoguns. When Yoritomo's sons and heirs were assassinated, the shogun himself became a hereditary figurehead. Real power rested with the Hōjō regents. The Kamakura shogunate lasted for almost 150 years, from 1192 to 1333.

The end of the Kamakura shogunate came when Kamakura fell in 1333, and the Hōjō Regency was destroyed. Determined to restore power to the Imperial Court, in 1331 Emperor Go-Daigo tried to overthrow the shogunate. As a result, Daigo was exiled. Around 1334–1336, Ashikaga Takauji helped Daigo regain his throne in the Kenmu Restoration.

The fight against the shogunate left the Emperor with too many people claiming a limited supply of land. Takauji turned against the Emperor when the discontent about the distribution of land grew great enough. In 1336 Daigo was banished again, in favor of a new Emperor, leading to the creation of the new Ashikaga shogunate.

During the Kenmu Restoration, after the fall of the Kamakura shogunate in 1333, another short-lived shogun arose. Prince Moriyoshi (Morinaga), son of Go-Daigo, was awarded the title of Sei-i Taishōgun. However, Prince Moriyoshi was later put under house arrest and, in 1335, killed by Ashikaga Tadayoshi.

Ashikaga (Muromachi) shogunate (1336/1338–1573)

In 1336 or 1338, Ashikaga Takauji, like Minamoto no Yoritomo, a descendant of the Minamoto princes, was awarded the title of sei-i taishōgun and established the Ashikaga shogunate, which nominally lasted until 1573. The Ashikaga had their headquarters in the Muromachi district of Kyoto, and the time during which they ruled is also known as the Muromachi period.

For the first fifty years of the Shogunate the Ashikaga were unable to assert power over the entire country, as the descendants of Go-Daigo formed a rival court challenging their authority in the Nanboku-chō period. Finally in 1392, the Southern Court surrendered to the Northern Court and the authority of the bakufu.

Following the Onin War the power of the Ashikaga Shoguns slowly dwindled and with the start of the Sengoku period were reduced to puppets of various warlords, until ultimately the last Muromachi Shogun, Ashikaga Yoshiaki was deposed in 1573.

Azuchi–Momoyama period (1573–1600)

With the end of the Ashikaga bakufu Oda Nobunaga and his successor, Toyotomi Hideyoshi, rose to power, governing using the court titles of Imperial Regent and gaining far greater power than any of their predecessors in those offices had. Hideyoshi is considered by many historians to be among Japan's greatest rulers, yet neither man was ever formally granted the title of Shogun.

Tokugawa shogunate (1600–1868) 

After Hideyoshi's death following the failed invasion of Korea, Tokugawa Ieyasu seized power with the victory at the Battle of Sekigahara and established a shogunate government at Edo (now known as Tokyo) in 1600. He received the title sei-i taishōgun in 1603, after he forged a family tree to show he was of Minamoto descent. 

The Tokugawa shogunate lasted until 1867, when Tokugawa Yoshinobu resigned as shogun and abdicated his authority to Emperor Meiji.

During the Edo period, effective power rested with the Tokugawa shogun, not the Emperor in Kyoto, even though the former ostensibly owed his position to the latter. The shogun controlled foreign policy, the military, and feudal patronage. The role of the Emperor was ceremonial, similar to the position of the Japanese monarchy after the Second World War.

The Honjō Masamune was inherited by successive shoguns and it represented the Tokugawa shogunate. It was crafted by swordsmith Masamune (1264–1343) and recognized as one of the finest Japanese swords in history. After World War 2, in December 1945, Tokugawa Iemasa gave the sword to a police station at Mejiro and it went missing.

Timelines

Timeline of the Kamakura shogunate

Timeline of the Ashikaga shogunate

Timeline of the Tokugawa shogunate

Shogunate

The term  originally meant the dwelling and household of a shogun, but in time, became a metonym for the system of government dominated by a feudal military dictatorship, exercised in the name of the shogun or by the shogun himself. Therefore, various bakufu held absolute power over the country (territory ruled at that time) with limited interruptions between 1192 to 1867, glossing over actual power, clan and title transfers.

The shogunate system was originally established under the Kamakura shogunate by Minamoto no Yoritomo after the Genpei War, although theoretically the state, and therefore the Emperor, still held de jure ownership of all land in Japan. The system had some feudal elements, with lesser territorial lords pledging their allegiance to greater ones. Samurai were rewarded for their loyalty with agricultural surplus, usually rice, or labor services from peasants. In contrast to European feudal knights, samurai were not landowners. The hierarchy that held this system of government together was reinforced by close ties of loyalty between the daimyō, samurai, and their subordinates.

Each shogunate was dynamic, not static. Power was constantly shifting and authority was often ambiguous. The study of the ebbs and flows in this complex history continues to occupy the attention of scholars. Each shogunate encountered competition. Sources of competition included the Emperor and the court aristocracy, the remnants of the imperial governmental systems, the daimyōs, the shōen system, the great temples and shrines, the sōhei, the shugo and jitō, the jizamurai and early modern daimyō. Each shogunate reflected the necessity of new ways of balancing the changing requirements of central and regional authorities.

Relationship with the emperor 

Since Minamoto no Yoritomo turned the figure of the shogun into a permanent and hereditary position and until the Meiji Restoration there were two ruling classes in Japan:
The shogun, head of the army who also enjoyed civil, military, diplomatic and judicial authority. Although in theory the shogun was an emperor's servant, it became the true power behind the throne.

No shogun tried to usurp the throne, even when they had at their disposal the military power of the territory. There were two reasons primarily:

Theoretically the shogun received the power of the emperor, so this was his symbol of authority.
There was a sentimentalist tradition created by priests and religious who traced the imperial line from the "age of the gods" into an "eternal line unbroken by the times." According to Japanese mythology, the emperor was a direct descendant of Amaterasu, goddess of the sun.

Unable to usurp the throne, the shoguns sought throughout history to keep the emperor away from the country's political activity, relegating them from the sphere of influence. One of the few powers that the imperial house could retain was that of being able to "control time" through the designation of the Japanese Nengō or Eras and the issuance of calendars.

Emperors twice tried to recover the power they enjoyed before the establishment of the shogunate. In 1219 the Emperor Go-Toba accused the Hōjō as outlaws. Imperial troops mobilized, leading to the Jōkyū War (1219–1221), which would culminate in the third Battle of Uji (1221). During this, the imperial troops were defeated and the emperor Go-Toba was exiled. With the defeat of Go-Toba, the samurai government over the country was confirmed. At the beginning of the fourteenth century the Emperor Go-Daigo decided to rebel, but the Hōjō, who were then regents, sent an army from Kamakura. The emperor fled before the troops arrived and took the imperial insignia. The shogun named his own emperor, giving rise to the era .

During the 1850s and 1860s, the shogunate was severely pressured both abroad and by foreign powers. It was then that various groups angry with the shogunate for the concessions made to the various European countries found in the figure of the emperor an ally through which they could expel the Tokugawa shogunate from power.

Legacy 
Upon Japan's surrender after World War II, American Army General Douglas MacArthur became Japan's de facto ruler during the years of occupation.

Today, the head of the Japanese government is the Prime Minister. The usage of the term "shogun" has nevertheless continued in colloquialisms. Examples of "shadow shoguns" are former Prime Minister Kakuei Tanaka and the politician Ichirō Ozawa.

See also
Commander-in-chief
Feudalism
Kantō kubō
History of Japan
List of shoguns

References

Bibliography 
 Adolphson, Mikael; Edward Kamens, Stacie Matsumoto (2007). Heian Japan: Centers and Peripheries. University of Hawaii Press. .
 Friday, Karl (2007). The First Samurai: The Life and Legend of the Warrior Rebel, Taira Masakado. John Wiley and Sons. .
 Hall, John Whitney; James L. McClain, Marius B. Jansen (1991). The Cambridge History of Japan. Cambridge University Press. .
 Iwao, Seiichi; Teizō Iyanaga, Maison Franco-Japonaise Tōkyō, Susumu Ishii, Shōichirō Yoshida (2002). Maisonneuve & Larose. .
 Cranston, Edwin (1998). A Waka Anthology: Volume One: The Gem-Glistening Cup. Stanford University Press. .
 Sansom, George Bailey (1931). Japan: A Short Cultural History. Stanford University Press. .
 Takekoshi, Yosaburō (2004). The Economic Aspects of the History of the Civilization of Japan. Taylor & Francis. .
 Shively, Donald; John Whitney Hall, William H. McCullough (1999). The Cambridge History of Japan: Heian Japan. Cambridge University Press. .
 De Bary, William Theodore; Yoshiko Kurata Dykstra; George Tanabe; Paul Varley (2001). Sources of Japanese Tradition: From Earliest Times to 1600. Columbia University Press. .
 Turnbull, Stephen (2005). Samurai Commanders (1) 940–1576. Osprey Publishing. .
 Turnbull, Stephen (2006a). Samuráis, la historia de los grandes guerreros de Japón. Libsa. ISBN 84-662-1229-9.
 Deal, William (2007). Handbook to Life in Medieval and Early Modern Japan. Oxford University Press US. .
 Perkins, Dorothy (1998). The Samurai of Japan: A Chronology from Their Origin in the Heian Era (794–1185) to the Modern Era. Diane Publishing. .
 Perkins, George. (1998). The Clear Mirror: A Chronicle of the Japanese Court During the Kamakura Period (1185–1333). Stanford University Press. .
 Murdoch, James (1996). A History of Japan: 1652–1868. Routledge. .
 Hall, John Whitney (1 January 1977). Japan in the Muromachi Age. University of California Press. p. 11. .
 Grossberg, Kenneth A. (1976). "From Feudal Chieftain to Secular Monarch. The Development of Shogunal Power in Early Muromachi Japan". Monumenta Nipponica. 31 (1): 34. doi:10.2307/2384184. ISSN 0027-0741.
 
 
 Andressen, Curtis; Milton Osborne (2002). A Short History of Japan: From Samurai to Sony. Allen & Unwin. ISBN 1-86508-516-2.
 Ramírez-Faria, Carlos. Concise Encyclopedia of World History. Atlantic Publishers & Distributors. ISBN 81-269-0775-4.
 Mitchelhill, Jennifer; David Green (2003). Castles of the Samurai: Power and Beauty. Kodansha International. ISBN 4-7700-2954-3.
 Kuno, Yoshi (2007). Japanese Expansion on the Asiatic Continent - Volume I. Read Books. ISBN 1-4067-2253-7.
 Davis, Paul (2001). 100 Decisive Battles: From Ancient Times to the Present. Oxford University Press US. ISBN 0-19-514366-3.

Further reading
Beasley, William G. (1955). Select Documents on Japanese Foreign Policy, 1853–1868. London: Oxford University Press. [reprinted by RoutledgeCurzon, London, 2001.  (cloth)]

Department of Asian Art. "Shoguns and Art". In Heilbrunn Timeline of Art History. New York: The Metropolitan Museum of Art, 2000–. 

Mass, Jeffrey P. and William B. Hauser, eds. (1985). The Bakufu in Japanese History. Stanford: Stanford University Press.

Nussbaum, Louis-Frédéric and Käthe Roth. (2005). Japan Encyclopedia. Cambridge: Harvard University Press. ; OCLC 48943301

Sansom, George. 1961. A History of Japan, 1134–1615. Stanford: Stanford University Press. 

Stephane Lun 倫世豪. A Guide on Shinsengumi: the background and management. 2021 Kindle Paperwhite version. Amazon.com

External links

 
Military ranks of Japan
Government of feudal Japan
Positions of authority
Titles of national or ethnic leadership
Military history of feudal Japan
2nd millennium in Japan